Cinespace Film Studios is a series of film studio facilities founded in 1988, by Greek-Canadian Nick Mirkopoulos. It includes a facility in Vaughan, that has been in operation since the 1960s.  In 2007 Mirkopoulos helped his Greek-American nephew Alex Pissios found a branch in Chicago, Cinespace Chicago Film Studios.

Studios

Kipling Avenue Studios

The company acquired a  campus at 777 Kipling Avenue in Toronto's Etobicoke area in 2009.

One of the large studios will be permanently devoted to underwater filming.

Television Series
 Beauty & the Beast (2012–2016)
 Black Mirror
 Condor
 Conviction (2016)
 Falling Water
 Good Witch
 Reign (2013–2017)
 Taken 
 The Handmaid's Tale
 The Umbrella Academy
 Titans
 Locke & Key

Kleinburg
Toronto International Studios is a film studio that was established in Kleinburg, Ontario in the 1950s.

Cinespace moved out of the studios in 2015, and the complex is now home to the Vaughan Sports Centre, a baseball training complex.

Chicago

Cinespace Chicago Film Studios opened for business in 2011  and Alex Pissios, the president and CEO of the company, worked with his uncle, Nick Mirkopoulos, to establish the Studios in Chicago. Mirkopoulos and Pissios purchased 60 acres of the former Ryerson Steel complex in the Windy City's North Lawndale neighborhood. The Studios are the largest independent movie studios outside of Los Angeles.

Alex Pissios, through his community leadership and commitment to giving back, Pissios has helped move the needle for the city of Chicago in the film industry. The Studios have continued to expand and now has 36 sound stages. Pissios and Cinespace Chicago Film Studios were featured in the December 2019 Chicago Magazine and highlighted the success and influence the studio has had on the film industry in Chicago. Cinespace Chicago Film Studios, is the “Hollywood of the Midwest,” bringing a multitude of digital media employment and education opportunities to the community and region by revitalizing a depressed neighborhood, and contributing to the creation of more than 15,000 jobs. His leadership at Cinespace Chicago has been instrumental in infusing billions of dollars of revenue into the city and the state of Illinois.

Its  campus has been the nexus for over 40 major productions used to film multiple television series and Feature Films, including:
 Chicago Med
 Chicago Fire
 Chicago PD
 Chicago Justice
 Empire
 Shameless
 Utopia
 Next
 Mixtape
 The Chi
 Fargo
 The Exorcist
 Sense8
 Patriot
 APB
 Proven Innocent
 Night Sky
 Zoobiquity

With 36 sound stages on its 2 million+ square foot main campus in Chicago's North Lawndale neighborhood, and additional studios currently under construction at 31st and Kedzie, Cinespace is the largest film studio outside of California. Since opening, Cinespace has helped bring more than 15,000 new jobs to the area. In addition to studio space, Cinespace Chicago Film Studios houses dozens of production offices and support spaces as well as numerous production tenants that offer equipment, casting services, post-production houses, a 3D animation company, plus camera and lighting rentals and sales.

Cinespace partnered with DePaul University's film school in 2013 to house student classrooms, two interactive stages, faculty offices, lounges, and equipment vaults. Ranked in the top 25 film schools nationwide, DePaul University's School of Cinematic Arts program teaches aspiring producers and creatives about all aspects of television and film production.

Since its inception, Cinespace has brought in more than 3 billion dollars in film-related spending to Chicago.

References

Canadian film studios
Cinema of Ontario